Lilian Ellis (25 May 1907 – 21 February 1951) was a Danish actress. She was born as Ellis Stampe Bendix.

Selected filmography
 Strauss Is Playing Today (1928)
 Lieutenant of His Majesty (1929)
 Wiener Herzen (1930)
 1000 Worte deutsch (1930)
Errant Husbands (1931)
 The Merry Wives of Vienna (1931)
 A Storm Over Zakopane (1931)
 The Woman They Talk About (1931)
 The Theft of the Mona Lisa (1931)
 En melodi om våren (1943)
 Elly Petersen (1944)
 De kloge og vi gale (1945)

Bibliography
 Jung, Uli & Schatzberg, Walter. Beyond Caligari: The Films of Robert Wiene. Berghahn Books, 1999.

References

External links

1907 births
1951 deaths
Danish film actresses
Danish silent film actresses
20th-century Danish actresses